Rassvet is a rural locality (a village) in Meleuzovsky Selsoviet, Meleuzovsky District, Bashkortostan, Russia. The population was 214 as of 2010. There are 3 streets.

Geography 
Rassvet is located 7 km southwest of Meleuz (the district's administrative centre) by road. Yumaguzino is the nearest rural locality.

References 

Rural localities in Meleuzovsky District